Lisa Quick (born 31 May 1975) is an English snooker and pool player. She won the World Women's Snooker Championship in 2001, and was runner-up to Kelly Fisher in 2002 and 2003. She also won the WEPF World Eight-ball championship in 1999 and 2001.

Biography
Quick began playing cue sports at the age of 13. Having won the world pool championship in 1999 and then the snooker title in 2001, she became first person in either the women's or the men's game to win both titles.

Following her World Snooker Championship victory, Quick told the BBC that she had to return to her job as shop assistant at a newsagent in Weston-Super-Mare the following morning, adding "but don't worry, I will be celebrating my win in style if I can get a day off later in the week."

Quick was named World Snooker's Woman Player of the Year in 2001.

Titles and achievements
Snooker

Pool

References

External links
 WLPBSA Hall of Fame archived at 21 March 2012.
Lisa Quick (WPBSA Tournament Manager)

Living people
1974 births
Female snooker players
English snooker players
Female pool players
English pool players